Turki Al-Mutairi (born 31 May 2001), is a Saudi Arabian professional footballer who plays as a winger for Al-Taawoun on loan from Al-Hilal.

Career
Al-Mutairi started his career at the youth teams of Al-Hilal. He made his first-team debut on 20 September 2020 in the AFC Champions League match against Shahr Khodro. On 4 January 2022, Al-Mutairi joined First Division side Al-Kholood on loan. On 20 July 2022, Al-Mutairi joined Pro League side Al-Batin on loan. After Al-Batin failed to register him in the squad, Al-Hilal decided to end his loan. On 27 August 2022, Al-Mutairi joined Al-Taawoun on loan.

Career statistics

Club

Notes

Honours

International
Saudi Arabia U23
WAFF U-23 Championship: 2022

References

External links
 

2001 births
Living people
Saudi Arabian footballers
Saudi Arabia youth international footballers
Saudi Arabian expatriate footballers
Association football wingers
Saudi First Division League players
Saudi Professional League players
Kuwait SC players
Al Hilal SFC players
Al-Kholood Club players
Al Batin FC players
Al-Taawoun FC players
Saudi Arabian expatriate sportspeople in Kuwait